Jean-Jacques Delmas (4 October 1938 – 8 February 2010) was a French physician.

1938 births
2010 deaths
Democratic Movement (France) politicians
20th-century French physicians
Union for French Democracy politicians
Mayors of places in Occitania (administrative region)
People from Lozère